The women's 400 metre individual medley event at the 11th FINA World Swimming Championships (25m) took place 12 December 2012 at the Sinan Erdem Dome.

Records
Prior to this competition, the existing world and championship records were as follows.

The following records were established during the competition:

Results

Heats
25 swimmers participated in 3 heats.

Final
The final was held at 20:16.

References

External links
 2012 FINA World Swimming Championships (25 m): Women's 400 metre medley entry list , from OmegaTiming.com.

Individual medley 400 metre, women's
World Short Course Swimming Championships
2012 in women's swimming